On the Day of Daggers (French: Journée des Poignards), 28 February 1791, hundreds of nobles with concealed weapons, such as daggers, went to the Tuileries Palace in Paris to defend King Louis XVI while Marquis de Lafayette and the National Guard were in Vincennes stopping a riot. A confrontation between the guards and nobles started as the guards thought the nobles came to take the King away. The nobles were finally ordered to relinquish their weapons by the King and they were forcibly removed from the palace.

Background

Starting in the later half of 1789, riots became a common occurrence in Paris. The Parisians expressed their discontent with the National Assembly for an act it created by taking to the streets and causing a violent commotion. The violence in Paris resulted in an increasing number of members of the nobility to emigrate from Paris to seek foreign aid or cause insurrection in the provinces to the south. French Emigration (1789–1815) was a mass movement of thousands of Frenchmen spanning various socioeconomic classes although it did begin with primarily a migration of members of the first and second estates, the clergy and the nobility.  The violence in Paris was an immediate reason for their leaving the vicinity, but the reason was that they fundamentally disagreed with the elimination of the old order which offered privilege to which the nobility had grown accustomed.

Among the emigrating nobles were the aunts of King Louis XVI: Madame Adélaïde and Madame Victoire. Mesdames believed it their duty to seek safety near the pope and on 19 February 1791 they set off on a pilgrimage to Rome. However they were stopped by the municipality of Arnay le Duc. The National Assembly held a prolonged debate over the departure of the Madames that was only ended by the statesman Jacques-François de Menou joking about the Assembly's preoccupation with the actions of "two old women". Mesdames were then permitted to continue their trip.

A rumor began circulating that the King and Queen would soon follow Mesdames' example and flee Paris. On 24 February 1791 a large group of alarmed and confused protesters went to the Tuileries Palace where the King was residing, seeking to petition him to recall his aunts. The mayor of Paris, Jean Sylvain Bailly, attempted to act as an intermediary by offering to allow a smaller contingent of 20 delegates into the palace to see the King. However the National Guard led by Lafayette remained firm in not allowing anyone in and dispersed the crowd after a three-hour standoff.

Day of Daggers

While the idea of the King's conspiracy to leave France grew, the Paris municipality voted to restore the dungeons of the Château de Vincennes to accommodate more prisoners. However a rumor developed claiming that there was an underground passage between the Tuileries and the Château. Suddenly people believed that the restoration was part of a conspiracy to disguise the passage and allow for the King to secretly leave France. Thus on 28 February 1791 workmen from the faubourgs armed with pickaxes and pikes followed the lead of Antoine Joseph Santerre to Vincennes to demolish the prison. The goals of these workmen were to prevent the King from escaping through the Château and dismantle "the last remaining Institution of the Country".

While Lafayette led a contingent of the National Guard to Vincennes to quell the riot there, many nobles became worried about the safety of the King with the absence of the guard. Worried about a Jacobin conspiracy to murder the royal family and the court, hundreds of young nobles with concealed weapons, such as daggers and knives, went to the Tuileries to defend the King. However the remaining officers of the National Guard began to suspect that the armed nobles arrived as part of a counter-revolution. Lafayette quickly returned from Vincennes and attempted to disarm the nobles. The nobles resisted until the King, who wanted to avoid a major conflict, requested that they lay down their weapons with the promise that their weapons will be returned the next day. The nobles finally gave in and left the Tuileries after being thoroughly searched, mocked and maltreated by the National Guard.

The following day Lafayette posted a proclamation on the walls of the capital that notified the National Guard that no more men "of a justly suspected zeal" were permitted into the Tuileries. The confiscated weapons of the nobles were seized by the soldiers and sold off.

Consequences

The conflict on 28 February, later deemed the Day of Daggers, humiliated the monarchists who had come to the Tuileries to defend the King. The specific actions of Lafayette the day after reaffirmed the rumor that the nobles had planned to take away the King, thus creating the legend of the conspiracy of the "chevaliers du poignard". The chevaliers du poignard was used in propaganda images from the Constitutionalists. One particular cartoon entitled "The Disarmament of Good Nobility" by the engraver Villeneuve showed the "exact form" of the infamous daggers used: a deformed dagger with inscriptions claiming that the blade was forged by aristocrats and that the monarchists had been led astray by the priests.

Additionally the respect and power of King Louis XVI was further diminished by his actions on that day. The royalists felt betrayed by his siding with the National Guard while the radical press spun the events as an abortive attempt at a counter-revolution. It is thought that this incident helped to cement the King's decision to flee Paris on 20 June 1791, due to his dissatisfaction with his waning power, increase of restrictions placed upon him, and his disagreement with the National Assembly on the topic of the Catholic priests.

Notes and Citations

References 

1791 events of the French Revolution
18th century in Paris